The Zeenath Baksh Juma Masjid ('Mosque that reflects beauty') commonly known as Masjid Zeenath Baksh is the 3rd oldest mosque in India and the oldest in the state of Karnataka constructed during 644 AD. This masjid which is also known as Beliye Palli  is located in the Bunder area in the city of Mangalore and is well known for its pure Indian architecture style.

The mosque was established by the kin and kith of sahabah of Muhammad, thus emerging as of exceptional importance to the Muslims in the region.

History 
Arab traders have had a warm longstanding relationship with the local population as well as the rulers of the western coastal belt of India from the earliest of the times, and have engaged in trade through the Arabian Sea.

Consequent on the advent of Islam in the early stage, a team of Arab Muslim Traders, under the Leadership of Islamic propagator Hazarath Mohammed Malik Bin Deenar had visited Malabar and landed at Kodungallur. The then ruler, Raja Cheruman Permal being very appeased with the extremely pious, honest, disciplinary behavior of Malik Deenar and his companions made sure that the traders were provided proper accommodation, necessary facilities, and also a place to trade. The king also went on to provide them with land to build mosques on their request.

Masjid Zeenath Baksh was the second out of the ten mosques built by them following Cheraman Juma Mosque of Kodungallur . The masjid was inaugurated on Friday the 22nd of the month of Jumada al-awwal, hijra 22 (approx. April 18, 643 AD), with Malik Bin Abdullah being appointed as the first Khazi.

In the later half of the 18th century, Tipu Sultan, the sultan of Mysore undertook the renovation process of the mosque. The mosque was not only renovated but also beautified with exquisite wooden carving. These rare pieces of artwork adorn the pillars and ceiling of the mosque.  It was also during this time that the mosque was renamed "Zeenath Baksh Jama Masjid" from "Malik Dinar Valya Juma-ath Masjid" by Tipu sultan after his daughter.

Features 
Although a mosque, Zeenath Baksh has characteristics similar to that of the many temples found in the region, most notably the temple tank similar to those in traditional Hindu temples is found within the proximity of the mosque.

Zeenath Baksh is the only mosque in the state of Karnataka made entirely of wood. The main highlight of the mosque is the wooden inner sanctum consisting of 16 pillars made of teak. The structure is adorned with patterns of symbols, bells, and flowers. It also has life stories of prophet Mohammad inscribed in it. This wooden structure is made up of teak and rosewood which has been used to construct the floor, ceiling, walls and the doors.

Gallery

See also 
 Cheraman Juma Mosque of Kodungallur
 Tipu Sultan
 Malik Deenar
 Jama Masjid

References 

Mosques in Karnataka
Buildings and structures in Dakshina Kannada district